Enriqueta Vila Vilar (born 1935) is a Spanish historian and researcher specialised on the History of the Americas.

Biography 
Born in 1935 in Seville, she earned a PhD in History of the Americas from the University of Seville in 1972. She worked as research lecturer at the Consejo Superior de Investigaciones Científicas (CSIC). She served as Seville municipal councillor in representation of the Andalucist Party (PA) and was charged with the municipal government area of Culture from 1991 to 1995. In 1995, she became the first female numerary member of the Real Academia Sevillana de Buenas Letras, serving as director of the learned society from 2011 to 2014. In January 2012, she was elected to cover the vacant seat as numerary member of Royal Academy of History left by the decease of Juan Vernet; she assumed on 16 December 2012, reading a speech titled Hispanismo e hispanización: el Atlántico como nuevo Mare Nostrum.

References 

1935 births
20th-century Spanish historians
Spanish women historians
Historians of the Hispanic world
Seville city councillors
University of Seville alumni
Living people
21st-century Spanish historians